Sphinx constricta, the Japanese privet hawkmoth, is a moth of the family Sphingidae. It is known from Japan.

It is similar to Sphinx ligustri, especially the pattern, but the pink colour is less intense. Furthermore, the antemedian and median pale bands on the hindwing upperside are connected at the costal and inner margins, which can also be observed in Sphinx ligustri, but only on rare occasions.

The larvae feed on Enkianthus perulatus, Helwingia japonica, Ilex crenata, Ilex macropoda, Rhododendron, Spiraea salicifolia, Spiraea thunbergii, Viburnum dilatatum and Weigela hortensis.

References

Sphinx (genus)
Moths described in 1885
Moths of Japan